This page covers all the important events in the sport of tennis in 2001. Primarily, it provides the results of notable tournaments throughout the year on both the ATP and WTA Tours, the Davis Cup, and the Fed Cup.

ITF

Grand Slam events

Davis Cup

Fed Cup

Hopman Cup

ATP Tour

Tennis Masters Cup

Tennis Masters Series

WTA Tour

WTA Tour Championships

Singles:  Serena Williams defeated  Lindsay Davenport, walkover

International Tennis Hall of Fame
Class of 2001:
Ivan Lendl, player
Mervyn Rose, player

See also
 2001 in sports

References

 
Tennis by year